The Wandsworth by-election was a Parliamentary by-election held on 12 June 1913. The constituency returned one Member of Parliament (MP) to the House of Commons of the United Kingdom, elected by the first past the post voting system.

Vacancy
At the 1885 general election, Sir Henry Kimber was elected as the Member of Parliament (MP) for Wandsworth.
He held the seat until his resignation in June 1913, by taking the Chiltern Hundreds.

Previous result

Candidates
Samuel Samuel was chosen by the Unionists to defend the seat. He unsuccessfully contested Leeds West at the 1906 and January 1910 general elections,
and was unsuccessful again in Sunderland at the December 1910 general election.

Havelock Wilson was chosen by the local Liberals as their candidate. He was MP for Middlesbrough from 1892 to 1900 and again from 1906 to 1910. He was President of the National Sailors' and Firemen's Union.

Campaign

Result

Aftermath
A General Election was due to take place by the end of 1915. By the summer of 1914, the following candidates had been adopted to contest that election. Due to the outbreak of war, the election never took place.

The constituency was divided at the 1918 general election, and Samuel was returned as a Conservative for the new Putney division of Wandsworth.

References

 Craig, F. W. S. (1974). British parliamentary election results 1885–1918 (1 ed.). London: Macmillan.
 Wikipedia: en.wikipedia.org
 Who's Who: www.ukwhoswho.com
 Debrett's House of Commons 1916

Wandsworth by-election
Wandsworth by-election
Wandsworth,1913
Wandsworth,1913